Spilosoma fumida is a species of moth of the family Erebidae. It was described by Alfred Ernest Wileman in 1910. It is found in Taiwan.

Description
Head and thorax grey brown with a blackish stripe on dorsum of thorax; palpi and lower part of frons blackish; antennas black; pectus at sides and fore femora with some crimson, the tibiae and tarsi blackish; abdomen crimson, the extremity and ventral surface greyish dorsal and lateral series of black spots. Forewing grey brown; an antemedial black point above vein 1; traces of a black point at upper angle of cell and two beyond lower angle; an oblique series of black points from apex to inner margin beyond middle placed in pairs on each side of the veins and obsolescent at middle; subterminal pairs of black points on each side of veins 5, 4, 3. Hindwing grey brown, the inner area slightly tinged with crimson; a large black discoidal spot; small subterminal spots on each side of vein 5. traces of a point below vein 4 and a curved band formed by three spots from vein 3 to termen at vein 1. Underside of forewing suffused with black on basal half except towards costa and inner margin, a large discoidal lunule, a post-medial spot below costa and oblique band from discal fold to vein 1, its upper extremity joined by an oblique series of points from apex; hindwing with the subterminal maculate band more entire.

The wingspan of the male is 50 mm and the female 54 mm.

References

Spilarctia fumida at Markku Savela's Lepidoptera and Some Other Life Forms

Moths described in 1910
fumida